La Lisa is one of the 15 municipalities or boroughs (municipios in Spanish) in the city of Havana, Cuba.

Overview
It has 7 neighbourhoods:
Alturas de La Lisa
Arroyo Arenas
Balcón Arimao
El Cano-Valle Grande-Bello 26 y Morado
Punta Brava
San Agustín
Versalles-Coronela.

It can be generally thought of as a semi-rural municipality.

References

External links

Municipalities of Havana